Dean Jones may refer to:
Dean Jones (cricketer) (1961–2020), Australian cricketer
Dean Jones (actor) (1931–2015), American actor
Dean Jones, singer of Extreme Noise Terror